I Am Just a Rebel is a studio album by American country music band Billy Hill. Released by Reprise Records in 1989, the album contains the hit song "Too Much Month at the End of the Money". It was the band's only album.

"Rollin' Dice" was originally recorded by lead singer Dennis Robbins in 1986 for his MCA Records album, The First of Me. It was also featured on the soundtrack to the film Pink Cadillac. Billy Hill's version of "I Can't Help Myself (Sugar Pie Honey Bunch)" made an appearance in the 1990 film My Blue Heaven.

Critical reception

The Chicago Tribune deemed I Am Just a Rebel a "rollicking album," writing that "Billy Hill delivers heat, humor and heart." The Advocate wrote: "Imagine Levon Helm getting together with Little Feat to play some hillbilly music and you have some idea of what Billy Hill sounds like ... There's lots of hot playing, and the songs are good, too."

The Buffalo News concluded that Billy Hill "have a big, fun, 'bloozy' sound that is heavy on slide guitar, somewhat similar to the Rolling Stones' occasional forays into country." The Orange County Register stated that the "music is down and dirty, R&B-influenced barroom country rock with a ballad or two thrown in for good measure."  USA Today listed I Am Just a Rebel as the 25th best country album of 1989.

Track listing

Personnel
Compiled from liner notes.

Billy Hill
 Bob DiPiero — background vocals
 Reno Kling — bass guitar
 Martin Parker — drums, percussion
 Dennis Robbins — lead and background vocals, acoustic guitar, electric guitar, slide guitar
 John Scott Sherrill — lead and background vocals, acoustic guitar, electric guitar

Additional musicians
 Bucky Baxter — steel guitar
 Barry Beckett — piano, Hammond B-3 organ
 Bessyl Duhon — accordion
 Glen Duncan — fiddle, mandolin

Chart performance

References

External links

1989 debut albums
Reprise Records albums